Hilham is an unincorporated community in Overton County, Tennessee. The community is situated around the junction of Tennessee State Route 136 (which runs north-to-south) and Tennessee State Route 85 (which runs east-to-west). Although not a census-designated place, Hilham is part of a Zip Code Tabulation Area (38568) that covers most of rural northwest Overton County and part of northeast Jackson County. As of the 2000 census, the population of this entire area was less than 2000.

Hilham was established in 1797 by Dartmouth graduate Moses Fisk (1759-1840), who believed the site was the geographic center of the United States (at the time, the Mississippi River was still the nation's western boundary). Fisk platted Hilham so that roads radiated out from the center of the community to the north, south, east and west, believing that Hilham would eventually be the ultimate crossroads of the new nation. In 1806, Fisk established one of the first female academies in the southeast at Hilham.

Demographics

References

External links

Moses Fisk Papers at the Tennessee State Library and Archives- http://tsla.tlcdelivers.com:8080/?config=default#section=resource&resourceid=152952191&currentIndex=3&view=fullDetailsDetailsTab

Unincorporated communities in Overton County, Tennessee
Unincorporated communities in Tennessee
Populated places established in 1797